Monroe (also referred to as Monroeton) is a borough in Bradford County, Pennsylvania, United States. It is part of Northeastern Pennsylvania. The population was 482 at the 2020 census.

Geography
Monroeton is located in south-central Bradford County at  (41.712709, -76.475308), in the valley of Towanda Creek, a tributary of the Susquehanna River. The borough is surrounded by Monroe Township but is separate from it. Monroeton was described in 1940 as "a Y-shaped farming village of small vine-covered houses."

U.S. Route 220 passes through the borough, leading north  to Towanda, the county seat, and south  to New Albany. Pennsylvania Route 414 leads west from the borough  to Canton.

While the official name of the borough is "Monroe", inhabitants refer to the community as "Monroeton". The U.S. Post Office there is "Monroeton, PA 18832" and the road signs at the borough limits say "Monroeton".

Demographics

As of the census of 2000, there were 514 people, 207 households, and 150 families residing in the borough. The population density was 789.6 people per square mile (305.3/km²). There were 224 housing units at an average density of 344.1 per square mile (133.1/km²). The racial makeup of the borough was 97.08% White, 0.39% African American, 0.39% Native American, 0.58% from other races, and 1.56% from two or more races. Hispanic or Latino of any race were 0.58% of the population.

There were 207 households, out of which 33.8% had children under the age of 18 living with them, 58.9% were married couples living together, 9.7% had a female householder with no husband present, and 27.5% were non-families. 21.7% of all households were made up of individuals, and 9.7% had someone living alone who was 65 years of age or older. The average household size was 2.48 and the average family size was 2.87.

In the borough the population was spread out, with 26.8% under the age of 18, 3.9% from 18 to 24, 27.0% from 25 to 44, 27.4% from 45 to 64, and 14.8% who were 65 years of age or older. The median age was 40 years. For every 100 females there were 100.8 males. For every 100 females age 18 and over, there were 90.9 males.

The median income for a household in the borough was $38,750, and the median income for a family was $43,125. Males had a median income of $35,179 versus $25,625 for females. The per capita income for the borough was $18,242. About 7.1% of families and 12.9% of the population were below the poverty line, including 22.9% of those under age 18 and none of those age 65 or over.

References

External links
 Monroe Borough, Bradford County, Pennsylvania

Populated places established in 1828
Boroughs in Bradford County, Pennsylvania
1855 establishments in Pennsylvania